Donald Lake (born November 26, 1956) is a Canadian actor, writer, and television producer. He is frequently cast by director Christopher Guest, and is also a close friend and the collaborative partner of Bonnie Hunt.

He had a role in The Bonnie Hunt Show, for which he received comedic praise. He also had roles in the comedy films Police Academy, Hot Shots!, Dumb & Dumber To, and Corner Gas: The Movie. He played more serious roles in Terminator 2: Judgment Day and Super Mario Bros., along with a voice role as Stu Hopps in Zootopia. He is also known as Dr. Carl Whitehorn on The Fresh Prince of Bel-Air.

Life and career
After graduating from the California Institute of the Arts, he returned to Toronto to join the Second City Touring Company, and later was promoted to The Second City. He also appeared in the Netflix comedy series Space Force.

Filmography

Film

Television

References

External links
 

California Institute of the Arts alumni
Canadian male film actors
Canadian male television actors
Canadian male voice actors
Canadian television writers
Living people
Canadian male television writers
Canadian male screenwriters
20th-century Canadian male actors
21st-century Canadian male actors
1956 births